John Ross OBE (1 September 1891 – 5 October 1973) was an Australian politician, elected as a member of the New South Wales Legislative Assembly for the seat of Albury. He was a member of the Nationalist Party of Australia.

Ross was made an Officer of the Order of the British Empire in 1959. His daughter Dorothy would be the first national president of the Country Women's Association.

Notes

Nationalist Party of Australia members of the Parliament of New South Wales
Members of the New South Wales Legislative Assembly
1891 births
1973 deaths
Australian Officers of the Order of the British Empire
20th-century Australian politicians